Heel-and-toe or heel-toe can mean:

 Heel-and-toe shifting, a driving technique
 Heel-toe technique, a percussion performance technique
the heel-and-toe polka, a dance